The Dar Yusuf Nasri Jacir for Art and Research is a multi-faceted artist-run space for artistic, educational, cultural and agricultural exchanges and research located in Bethlehem. It was founded in 2014 by Emily Jacir;  Annemarie Jacir and Yusuf Nasri Jacir are co-founders. The space is located in their 19th century family home in Bethlehem. Originally built in the late 1880's by al Mukhtar Yusuf Jacir.  Emily Jacir is the Director and Aline Khoury is Program Manager.

Location
The Centre lies in Area A of the Israeli occupied West Bank, on the outskirts of Bethlehem, at the entrance of El Khalil Road, a major transit point between Hebron and Jerusalem. The Separation Wall and the site of Rachel's Tomb it encircles lies nearby, at a distance of some 600 feet.

Activities
The centre is an important hub for artists writers, musicians and researchers visiting the West Bank. Since its foundation it has hosted a number of international artists, including the Cuban-American artist, Coco Fusco, the British-Palestinian novelist Isabella Hammad, Michael Rakowitz, the American-Chilean composer, Nicolas Jaar, and also Trevor Paglen and Sam Durant, in its residency program, which started in 2018.

Raid
During the 2021 Israel–Palestine crisis, the treed field adjacent to the centre was burnt to the ground and some days later, according to its owners, the centre itself was raided by Israeli forces.  notable damage had been caused by an intrusion and, according to the owners, phones, computers, hard drives, cameras and books were confiscated. The report has not been yet independently confirmed.

Fundraising 
After the raid, an online fundraising campaign to finance reconstruction and replace damaged or lost infrastructure managed to raise $25,000 within two days. By June that figure reached $30,000. The goal is to raise $50,000, to restore the Urban Farm on the property and secure the future of the Centre's activities.

Notes

Citations

Sources

Buildings and structures in Bethlehem
Music organizations based in the State of Palestine